Peter Hirsch (born 1956) is a German conductor, especially of opera. He has conducted several premieres, including Hans Zender's Stephen Climax at the Oper Frankfurt, and is focused on the work by Bernd Alois Zimmermann. Hirsch has appeared at international opera houses and festivals.

Life and career 
Born in Cologne, Hirsch  studied  at the Hochschule für Musik und Tanz Köln. Subsequently he was assistant to Michael Gielen at the Oper Frankfurt, where he was first Kapellmeister from 1984 to 1987.

Hirsch conducted the premiere of the revised and complete version of Luigi Nono's Prometeo at La Scala in Milan in 1985. A year later, he conducted the world premiere of Hans Zender's opera Stephen Climax in Frankfurt, and of Nono's Risonanze erranti.

He has conducted opera in Europe (at the Welsh National Opera, the English National Opera, the Nederlandse Opera and the Staatsoper Unter den Linden among others). In addition, Hirsch has worked regularly with the Deutsches Symphonie-Orchester Berlin and the Rundfunk-Sinfonieorchester Berlin. He has worked with the hr-Sinfonieorchester, the  MDR Sinfonieorchester, the  National Orchestra of Belgium and the Bournemouth Symphony Orchestra.

Hirsch conducted world premieres also by Georg Friedrich Haas, Helmut Lachenmann and Klaus Ospald. Dedicated to the works by Bernd Alois Zimmermann, he has recorded his orchestral works with the WDR Sinfonieorchester Köln, among others.

References

Further reading

External links 
 
 

1956 births
Living people
Musicians from Cologne
Male conductors (music)
20th-century German conductors (music)
20th-century German male musicians
21st-century German conductors (music)
21st-century German male musicians
Hochschule für Musik und Tanz Köln alumni
20th-century male musicians